Lieutenant General Ferdinand Mendez Cartujano is a Filipino Air Force General who served as the 82nd Superintendent of the Philippine Military Academy since 16 November 2020. Prior to his position, he served as the commander of the Air Force Education, Training and Doctrine Command, the Chief of Academy Staff, Philippine Military Academy, the 505th Search and Rescue Group, and the 5051st Search and Rescue Squadron. Cartujano retired from military service on 26 June 2022 after 34 years in military service.

Early life and education
Cartujano was born at San Miguel, Bulacan on 26 June 1966, and grew up at Roxas City in Capiz. He entered the Philippine Military Academy (PMA) in 1984, and graduated as a member of the PMA Maringal Class of 1988. After graduating from the PMA, Cartujano also entered various courses locally and abroad, such as the PAF Flying School at Basilio Fernando Air Base in 1990, where he finished his course with "flying colors"; the Squadron Officers Course, where he graduated Number 2 in his class; the AFP Logistics Officers Integrated Course, graduating Number 1 in his class; the Air Intelligence Officers’ Course, where he also graduated at the top of his class; the AFP Financial Management Course, finishing at Number 3 of his class; the Australian Command General Staff Course at the Australian Defence College in Canberra, Australia, the Senior Executive Course in National Security Class 10 at the National Defense College of the Philippines (NDCP); the Defense Resource Management Seminar and the Regional Seminar-Workshop on Transparency and Conventional Arms in the United Nation Economic and Social Commission for Asia and the Pacific (ESCAP) Headquarters in Bangkok, Thailand. 

Cartujano also holds a master's degree in Defense Studies (MDS) at the University of Canberra and a master's degree in Business Economics (MBE) at the University of Asia and the Pacific in Mandaluyong City.

Military career
Cartujano started his career at the Philippine Air Force (PAF) when he was assigned the 207th Tactical Helicopter "Stingers" Squadron, under the 205th Tactical Helicopter Wing, where he served as an assault helicopter pilot, piloting the Air Force's Bell UH-1H Huey helicopters, and assisted assault and tactical operations within key areas that are known as insurgency hotspots, such as in Marag Valley in Apayao, in Camarines Sur; in Central Visayas, particularly at the Negros Island; and on the areas of Southern Mindanao. Cartujano also served at staff positions and led various units in the PAF, such as being the Squadron Commander of the 5051st Search and Rescue Squadron, where his unit was awarded as the Best Squadron Commander of the Year for three consecutive years from 2001 to 2003, due to his successful rescue operations throughout the typhoon seasons.

Cartujano has accumulated a total of more than 5,000 flying hours, primarily on helicopters like the Bell UH-1H Hueys, and the Bell 205A search and rescue helicopters. Cartujano also served at administrative positions in the PAF and in the PMA, such as in the Office of the Deputy Chief of Staff for Plans (OJ-5), the Office of the Assistant Chief of Air Staff for Operations, Organization & Training (OA-3), the Air Force Management and Fiscal Office, the Office of the Air Force Adjutant General, and as the Chief of Division Staff of 1st Air Division. He also became the Group Commander of the 505th Search and Rescue Group and served as the Deputy Wing Commander of 600th Air Base Wing. In 2016, Cartjuano became the Chief of Academy Staff of the PMA, before being named as the Assistant Superintendent of the PMA in 2017. Cartujano became the Deputy Commander of the  Air Force Education, Training and Doctrine Command on 2018, before being named as its Commander on 17 September 2019, where he was also promoted to Major General.

On 16 November 2020, he took command as the 82nd Superintendent of the Philippine Military Academy, replacing Vice Admiral Allan Ferdinand V. Cusi, who reached the mandatory retirement age of 56. As PMA Superintendent, he vowed to continue creating reforms from his predecessor to completely remove hazing and maltreatment within the academy. He was also promoted to Lieutenant General in January 2021 and was confirmed for promotion on his post by the Commission on Appointments on 24 March 2021. 

Cartujano's term as Superintendent of the Philippine Military Academy ended on 26 June 2022, during his 56th birthday. and was eventually replaced by Major General Rowen S. Tolentino.

Awards and decorations in military service
Left Side:

Right Side:

Badges and Other Awards:
 Australian Command and Staff College Badge
 AFP Logistics Eligibility Badge
 Philippine Air Force Flight Plan 2028 Badge

Personal life
He is married to Dinna Anna Lee Lumibao-Cartujano, who serves as the Director IV, Office of Human Resource at the Department of National Defense, and they have 2 daughters.

References

1966 births
Living people